Gaël Duhayindavyi (born 3 October 1990) is a Burundian professional footballer who plays as a midfielder for Rwandan side Mukura Victory Sports and the Burundi national team.

International career
He was called up by national team coach Lofty Naseem to represent Burundi in the 2014 African Nations Championship held in South Africa.

International goals
Scores and results list Burundi's goal tally first.

References

1990 births
Living people
Burundian footballers
Burundi international footballers
Association football midfielders
Burundi A' international footballers
2014 African Nations Championship players
2019 Africa Cup of Nations players
Atlético Olympic FC players
Vital'O F.C. players
Mukura Victory Sports F.C. players
Burundian expatriate footballers
Burundian expatriate sportspeople in Rwanda
Expatriate footballers in Rwanda
Sportspeople from Bujumbura